M. P. Shankar (20 August 1935 – 17 July 2008) was an Indian actor in Kannada cinema. He acted in films like Satya Harishchandra as 'Veera Baahu', Naagarahaavu as 'Pailwan Basanna', Bhootayyana Maga Ayyu, Ratnamanjari etc.

He produced the film Gandhada Gudi starring Rajkumar in which Shankar also acted. He died on 17 July 2008 in Mysore.

Early life
Shankar was the third son of Puttalingappa and Gangamma. His father ran a handloom textile industry. Shankar had his primary and secondary education in Dalvoy School and higher secondary education in Banumaiah's High School. His family got into financial crisis due to losses at textile industry. He could not even appear for SSLC exams because of financial problems. He worked as a daily wager in the then Mysore Electricity Board.

Career
Shankar started his career as a foundry man in the railway workshop at Mysore in 1955 on a monthly wage of Rs. 80. This iron grinding work affected his body. Shankar, who practised wrestling, participated in the Dasara wrestling competition in 1956 and received title from the then Chief Minister B. D. Jatti.  He dreamt of winning the "Sri Mysore" wrestling title. But the wrestling competition was suspended for three years from 1957, following the violence which broke out during the competition that year. His acting talent came to light when he played the role of Kadu Kuruba in the diamond jubilee celebration of Banumaiah's Institutions and received a prize from Sri Jayachamaraja Wadiyar.

He formed a drama troupe under the banner Bharani Kalavidaru and enacted plays such as Gadayuddha, Yechchama Nayaka, Yelahanka Bhoopala and Raja Gopichand throughout the State.

M. P. Shankar made his entry into films in 1962 as a villain in the film Ratnamanjari, directed by Hunsur Krishnamurthy and made a name for himself in the cine industry. He earned the distinction of acting in 108 films. Shankar acted as a villain in films such as Veera Sankalpa, Kadina Rahasya, Naari Munidare Maari, Gandhada Gudi , Rama Lakshmana and Bhootayyana Maga Ayyu
.

Shankar started his own production unit in 1968 under the banner "Bharani Chitra". He began creating awareness about environment and wildlife through his films like Kaadina Rahasya, Gandhada Gudi, Rama Lakshmana, Mrugalaya.

Partial filmography

Death
He died on 17 July 2008 after a prolonged illness at his residence Manjunatha Nilaya in Vijayanagar in Mysore city. He is survived by his wife Manjula, son Tilak and daughter Shobha. The last rites were held with full state honours in Mysore on 18 July.

References

External links
 

1935 births
2008 deaths
Male actors in Kannada cinema
Indian male film actors
Male actors from Mysore
Deaths from bone cancer
20th-century Indian male actors
Kannada film producers
Film producers from Karnataka
Businesspeople from Mysore